Leanne Maree Linard (born 29 October 1980) is an Australian politician. She has been the Labor Party member for Nudgee in the Queensland Legislative Assembly since 2015. On 12 November 2020, Linard was sworn in as a cabinet minister in the third Palaszczuk government as Minister for Children and Youth Justice and Minister for Multicultural Affairs. Her responsibilities as Minister include adoption, child protection services, youth justice, the redress scheme for Queensland survivors of institutional child sexual abuse and multicultural affairs.

Linard grew up in Banyo, lived in Nundah for many years, and along with her husband Ian, is now raising her two young boys in Nudgee. Leanne attended Virginia State Primary and was School Captain of Banyo State High (now Earnshaw State College). As the daughter of a RAAF pilot and engineer, Leanne has grown up knowing the value of community service.

Leanne currently serves as Chair to the Education, Employment and Small Business Committee, as well as a Member of the Ethics Committee.

References

1980 births
Living people
Members of the Queensland Legislative Assembly
Australian Labor Party members of the Parliament of Queensland
Queensland University of Technology alumni
21st-century Australian politicians
Women members of the Queensland Legislative Assembly
21st-century Australian women politicians